Fort Richelieu is a historic fort in La Vallée-du-Richelieu Regional County Municipality, Quebec, Canada. The fort is designated as a National Historic Site of Canada. Fort Richelieu was part of a series of five forts built along the Richelieu River and is at the mouth of the Richelieu River. Fort Chambly formerly known as Fort St. Louis at Chambly, Fort Sainte-Thérèse, and Fort Saint-Jean at Saint-Jean-sur-Richelieu, are on the way. Fort Sainte Anne (Vermont) on Isle La Motte, Vermont in Lake Champlain is near its source. The forts were built in order to protect travellers on the river from the Iroquois. The region is informally known as la Vallée-des-Forts.

History

The fort was established at the mouth of the Richelieu River, near the modern city of Sorel-Tracy, in 1641. It was built by Charles Huault de Montmagny, first Governor and Lieutenant-Governor of New France, and named in honour of Cardinal Richelieu, chief minister to Louis XIII. The fort was burned down by the Iroquois in 1647. In 1665, the Carignan-Salières Regiment, under the direction of Pierre de Saurel, rebuilt the fort on the same site.

Affiliations
The museum is affiliated with Canadian Museums Association, Canadian Heritage Information Network and Virtual Museum of Canada.

See also

List of French forts in North America

References

External links

 Richelieu River Forts
 Pierre de Saurel

History museums in Quebec
Richelieu
Buildings and structures in Montérégie
National Historic Sites in Quebec
Richelieu
Buildings and structures completed in 1641
Buildings and structures completed in 1665
Tourist attractions in Montérégie
History of Montérégie
1641 establishments in the French colonial empire
Forts or trading posts on the National Historic Sites of Canada register
Sorel-Tracy